Dayana Carolina Colmenares Bocchieri (born December 28, 1984, in Maracay) is a Venezuelan beauty pageant titleholder, who won Miss Venezuela International 2007, and television personality.  She competed in Miss International 2008 on November 8 in Macau and ranked as one of the top 12 semifinalists.

She represented Carabobo.

She also placed as the second runner-up at Miss United Continents 2006, pageant held in Guayaquil, Ecuador on August 28, 2006.

She has her own television show on the Venezuelan tourism channel Sun Channel.  In the show, Azul Profundo, she travels the country in search of the best scuba diving hot spots.  Dayana is a certified diver.

Dayana studied advertising and marketing at TSU.

References

External links
Miss Venezuela Official Website
Miss International Official Website

1984 births
Living people
People from Maracay
Miss Venezuela International winners
Venezuelan beauty pageant winners
Miss International 2008 delegates
Venezuelan television personalities